Maurice Séguin (7 December 1918 – 28 August 1984) is a Canadian historian who, along with Michel Brunet and Guy Frégault, is credited with creating the Montreal School of Canadian history.

References
.
.
.
.
.

1918 births
1984 deaths
Historians from Quebec
20th-century Canadian historians